Cruciate, and similar words, can mean:
The cruciate ligaments in the knee
For a magic spell in the Harry Potter scenario, see crucio
Latin and early-English word for crusade